Dalmeny is a dispersed rural community located near the source of the South Castor River in the Osgoode Ward of Ottawa, Ontario, Canada. The population of the surrounding area is about 225.

Prior to amalgamation in 2001, Dalmeny was in Osgoode Township.

References

See also
List of communities in Ontario

Neighbourhoods in Ottawa